"Gentleman" is a song by Lou Bega. It was the first single from his album Ladies and Gentlemen.

Chart performance

Track listing
Maxi single
 "Gentleman" (Radio Edit) - 3:40
 "Gentleman" (Alternative Radio Edit) - 3:40
 "Gentleman" (Latin Version) - 3:41
 "Club Elitaire" (Album Version) - 5:05
 "Soon" (Short Cuts from the Forthcoming Lou Bega Album) - 3:40

References

2001 singles
Lou Bega songs
Songs written by Axel Breitung
2001 songs